Aivar Kuusmaa (born 12 June 1967) is an Estonian basketball coach and former professional basketball player who played mostly at the shooting guard position.

He won the USSR Premier Basketball League in 1991 as a member of the Tallinn Kalev basketball team. Kuusmaa mostly played in Estonia, but he also spent three seasons in Greece, with Panathinaikos and one season in Belgium, with Liege Basket. Also, during the service in the Soviet Army, Kuusmaa was stationed in Latvian SSR and played in the local army sports club Rīgas ASK. After retiring in 2005 he has been coaching BC Kalev/Cramo (2005–2007 & 2010–2012), TTÜ KK (2007–2010) and AVIS Utilitas Rapla (2014–2018). Kuusmaa has also greek citizenship under the surname Magoulas. Elected to the Hall of fame of Estonian basketball in 2020.

Achievements
As a player
 1985–86 Estonian SSR Championship (Standard)
 1986–87 Latvian SSR Championship (Rīgas ASK)
 1987–88 Estonian SSR Championship (Standard)
 1988–89 Estonian SSR Championship (Tallinna Kalev)
 1989–90 World Basketball League Championship (Youngstown Pride)
 1990–91 Soviet Union Championship (Tallinna Kalev)
 1991–92 Estonian League Championship (Tallinna Kalev)
 1992–93 Estonian League Championship (Tallinna Kalev)
 1995–96 Greek Basketball Cup (Panathinaikos)
 1998–99 Estonian Basketball Cup (Tallinn)
 1998–99 Estonian League Championship (Tallinn)
 1999–00 Estonian League Championship (Tallinna Kalev)
 2003–04 Estonian Basketball Cup (TTÜ/A.Le Coq)

As a coach
 2005–06 Estonian Basketball Cup (Kalev/Cramo)
 2005–06 Estonian League Championship (Kalev/Cramo)
 2006–07 Estonian Basketball Cup (Kalev/Cramo)
 2010–11 Estonian League Championship (Kalev/Cramo)
 2011–12 Estonian League Championship (Kalev/Cramo)

Season by season results as head coach
Abbreviations:QF; quarter-finals.T16; top sixteen.R1; first round.DNP; did not participate.

Books

References

1967 births
Living people
ASK Riga players
BC Kalev/Cramo coaches
Estonian basketball coaches
Estonian expatriate basketball people in Belgium
Estonian expatriate basketball people in Greece
Estonian expatriate basketball people in the United States
Estonian men's basketball players
Greek Basket League players
Greek people of Estonian descent
KK Kalev players
Liège Basket players
Naturalized citizens of Greece
Panathinaikos B.C. players
Shooting guards
Soviet expatriate basketball people in the United States
Soviet expatriate basketball people
Soviet men's basketball players
Basketball players from Tallinn